Leon Jucewicz (November 18, 1902 – January 13, 1984) was a Polish speed skater who competed in the 1924 Winter Olympics. He was born in Szwekni, now in Latvia.

In 1924 he finished 17th in the 500 metres event, 15th in the 1500 metres competition, 16th in the 5000 metres event, and 14th in the 10000 metres competition. In the all-round event he finished eighth.

External links 
 
 Profile 

1902 births
1984 deaths
Polish male speed skaters
Olympic speed skaters of Poland
Speed skaters at the 1924 Winter Olympics
People from the Russian Empire of Polish descent
Place of birth missing